Caroline Mary Ghislaine Foster (born 13 January 1981) is an English cricket coach and former player. She was a right-handed batter and right-arm medium bowler who appeared in 9 Test matches, 58 One Day Internationals and 19 Twenty20 Internationals for England between 2001 and 2011. She primarily played county cricket for Sussex before ending her career with Somerset. She also spent two Women's National Cricket League seasons with South Australia.

Early life

Foster was born on 13 January 1981 in Burgess Hill, West Sussex. She attended Burgess Hill Girls, an all-girls private school.

International career
In January 2002, Foster and Arran Brindle shared a partnership of 200 against India at K. D. Singh Babu Stadium, Lucknow, which was at the time a record for the first wicket in women's Test cricket.

Foster was a member of the side which retained the Ashes in Australia in 2008.

In August 2008, Foster and Sarah Taylor shared a partnership of 268 against South Africa at Lord's, which was at the time a record for any wicket in women's One Day Internationals. Foster was dismissed for 145, her highest score in international cricket.

Foster was a member of the England team which won both the World Cup and World Twenty20 in 2009.

Coaching career

Foster is employed by the Cricket Foundation as a Chance to Shine coaching ambassador and is a coach at Queen's College a private school in Taunton which is in Somerset. She was the head coach of Western Storm for the 2016 Women's Cricket Super League.

References

External links
 

1981 births
Living people
People from Burgess Hill
People educated at Burgess Hill School
Alumni of the College of St Hild and St Bede, Durham
England women Test cricketers
England women One Day International cricketers
England women Twenty20 International cricketers
Somerset women cricketers
South Australian Scorpions cricketers
Sussex women cricketers
English cricket coaches